Indian Telly Award for Best Actor in a Lead Role (Male) is an award given as a part of the annual Indian Telly Awards.

The award was first awarded in 2002 under the title TV Actor Of The Year. A special award called Best Actor Jury was also awarded occasionally in 2000s, whose winner was selected by the jury of critics assigned to the function.

The jury award was awarded without prior nominations until 2012. Since then, the jury award is also awarded with nominations just like the original award which is now called Best Actor Popular.

Superlatives

Popular Award

2000s
2001Not Awarded
2002Kiran Karmarkar for Kahaani Ghar Ghar Kii as Om Agarwal & Shivaji Satam for CID as ACP Pradyuman.
Aamir Bashir for Sarhadein as Aman Malik
Ali Asgar for Kahaani Ghar Ghar Kii as Kamal Agarwal
Govind Namdeo for Ankahee as Pradhan
Ravi Khanvillkar for Haqeeqat as Sadanand
Varun Badola for Des Mein Niklla Hoga Chand as Dev Mallik
2003Aman Verma for Kehta Hai Dil as Adityapratap Singh & Shivaji Satam for CID as ACP Pradyuman.
Cezanne Khan for Kasautii Zindagii Kay as Anurag Basu
Kiran Karmarkar for Kahaani Ghar Ghar Kii as Om Agarwal
Mihir Mishra for Sanjivani as Dr. Rahul Mehra
Ronit Roy for Kyunki Saas Bhi Kabhi Bahu Thi as Mihir Virani
Varun Badola for Astitva...Ek Prem Kahani as Abhimanyu Saxena
2004Hiten Tejwani for Kyunki Saas Bhi Kabhi Bahu Thi as Karan Virani. 
Hussain Kuwajerwala for Kumkum - Ek Pyara Sa Bandhan as Sumit Wadhwa
Kiran Karmarkar for Kahaani Ghar Ghar Kii as Om Agarwal
Rajeev Khandelwal for Kahiin To Hoga as Sujal Garewal
Ronit Roy for Kyunki Saas Bhi Kabhi Bahu Thi as Mihir Virani
Shivaji Satam for C.I.D. as ACP Pradyuman
Varun Badola for Astitva...Ek Prem Kahani as Abhimanyu Saxena
2005Apoorva Agnihotri for Jassi Jaissi Koi Nahin as Armaan Suri.Eijaz Khan for Kkavyanjali as Kavya Nanda
Hussain Kuwajerwala for Kumkum - Ek Pyara Sa Bandhan as Sumit Wadhwa
Pawan Shankar for Siddhanth as Siddhanth
Rajeev Khandelwal for Kahiin To Hoga as Sujal Garewal
Ronit Roy for Kasautii Zindagii Kay as Rishabh Bajaj
Varun Badola for Astitva...Ek Prem Kahani as Abhimanyu Saxena2006Ram Kapoor for Kasamh Se as Jai Walia.
Arvind Rathod for Thodi Khushi Thode Gham as Mansukh Lal Shah
Eijaz Khan for Kkavyanjali as Kavya Nanda
Hussain Kuwajerwala for Kumkum as Sumit Wadhwa
Rajeev Khandelwal for Left Right Left as Captain Rajveer Singh Shekhawat
Ronit Roy for Kasautii Zindagii Kay as Rishabh Bajaj
Pawan Shankar for Siddhanth as Siddhanth
Shakti Anand for Ek Ladki Anjaani Si as Nikhil Samarth2007Ram Kapoor for Kasamh Se as Jai Walia.
Apoorva Agnihotri for Kaajjal as Dev Pratap Singh
Hussain Kuwajerwala for Kumkum - Ek Pyara Sa Bandhan as Sumit Wadhwa
Rajeev Khandelwal for Left Right Left as Captain Rajveer Singh Shekhawat
Rohit Roy for Viraasat as Rahul Lamba
Shabbir Ahluwalia for Kayamath as Milind Mishra
Sharad Malhotra for Banoo Main Teri Dulhann as Sagar Pratap Singh
Sushant Singh for Virrudh as Sushant
Varun Badola for Aek Chabhi Hai Padoss Mein as Sandeep Shukla2008Sharad Malhotra for Banoo Main Teri Dulhann as Sagar Pratap Singh.
Angad Hasija for Sapna Babul Ka...Bidaai as Alekh Rajvansh
Harshad Chopda for Kis Desh Mein Hai Meraa Dil as Prem Juneja
Karan Singh Grover for Dill Mill Gaye as Dr. Armaan Mallik
Ram Kapoor for Kasamh Se as Jai Walia
Shabbir Ahluwalia for Kayamath as Milind Mishra2009Ronit Roy for Bandini as Dharamraj Mahiyavanshi.
Angad Hasija for Sapna Babul Ka...Bidaai as Alekh Rajvansh
Avinash Sachdev for Chotti Bahu – Sindoor Bin Suhagan as Dev Raj Purohit
Karan Mehra for Yeh Rishta Kya Kehlata Hai as Naitik Singhania
Sushant Singh Rajput for Pavitra Rishta as Manav Deshmukh

2010s2010Harshad Chopda for Tere Liye as Anurag Ganguly.
Aditya Redij for Na Aana Is Des Laado  as Raghav
Arhaan Behl for Mann Kee Awaaz Pratigya as Krishna Singh
Iqbal Khan for Sanjog Se Bani Sangini as Rudra
Karan Mehra for Yeh Rishta Kya Kehlata Hai as Naitik
Nandish Sandhu for Uttaran as Veer Singh Bundela
Ronit Roy for Bandini as Dharamraj Mahiyanshi
Sushant Singh Rajput for Pavitra Rishta as Manav Deshmukh2011Not Awarded2012Ram Kapoor for Bade Achhe Lagte Hain as Ram Kapoor & Samir Soni for Parichay as Kunal Chopra.
Anas Rashid for Diya Aur Baati Hum as Sooraj Arun Rathi
Gurmeet Chaudhary for Geet - Hui Sabse Parayi as Maan Singh Khurana
Hiten Tejwani for Pavitra Rishta as Manav Damodar Deshmukh
Ronit Roy for Adaalat as KD Pathak2013Anas Rashid for Diya Aur Baati Hum as Sooraj Rathi & Kunal Karan Kapoor for Na Bole Tum Na Maine Kuch Kaha as Mohan Bhatnagar.
Vivian Dsena for Madhubala - Ek Ishq Ek Junoon as Rishabh Kundra
Gurmeet Chaudhary for Punar Vivaah as Yash Sindhia
Mohit Raina for Devon Ke Dev...Mahadev as Shiva
Karan Singh Grover for Qubool Hai as Asad Khan
Ram Kapoor for Bade Achhe Lagte Hain as Ram Kapoor2014Gautam Rode for Saraswatichandra as Saraswatichandra & Rajat Tokas for Jodha Akbar as Akbar.
Karan Patel for Yeh Hai Mohabbatein as Raman Bhalla
Mohit Raina for Devon Ke Dev...Mahadev as Shiva
Anas Rashid for Diya Aur Baati Hum as Sooraj Rathi
Shaheer Sheikh for Mahabharat as Arjuna
Saurabh Raj Jain for Mahabharat as Krishna
Ashish Sharma for Rangrasiya as Rudra2015Karan Patel for Yeh Hai Mohabbatein as Raman Bhalla.
Shabbir Ahluwalia for Kumkum Bhagya as Abhishek Mehra
Ronit Roy for Itna Karo Na Mujhe Pyar as Nachiket Khanna
Shakti Arora for Meri Aashiqui Tumse Hi as Ranveer Vaghela
Ravi Dubey for Jamai Raja as Siddharth Khurana
Anas Rashid for Diya Aur Baati Hum as Sooraj Rathi
Sharad Malhotra for Bharat Ka Veer Putra – Maharana Pratap as Maharana Pratap2016Not Awarded2017Not Awarded2018Not Awarded2019Nakuul Mehta as Shivaay Singh Oberoi for Ishqbaaaz.
Harshad Chopda as Aditya Hooda for Bepannah
Parth Samthaan as Anurag Basu for Kasautii Zindagii Kay
Shaheer Sheikh as Salim for Dastaan-E-Mohabbat Salim Anarkali
Shakti Arora as Kunal Malhotra for Silsila Badalte Rishton Ka
Mohit Malik as Sikander Singh Gill for Kullfi Kumarr Bajewala
Arjun Bijlani as Deep Raj Singh for Ishq Mein Marjawan
Vivek Dahiya as for Qayamat Ki Raat
Siddharth Nigam as Aladdin for Aladdin - Naam Toh Suna Hoga
Pearl V Puri as Mahir Sehgal for Naagin 3
Karan Patel as Raman Bhalla for Yeh Hai Mohabbatein
Mohsin Khan as Kartik Goenka for Yeh Rishta Kya Kehlata Hai
Vivian Dsena as Harman Singh for Shakti - Astitva Ke Ehsaas Ki
Shabir Ahluwalia as Abhishek Mehra for Kumkum Bhagya2021Parth Samthaan - Kasautii Zindagi KayMohit Sehgal - Naagin 5
Sharad Malhotra - Naagin 5
Mohit Malik - Kulfi Kumar Bajewala

Jury Award2005Pawan Shankar for Siddhanth as Siddhanth.2006Not Awarded2007Sharad Malhotra for Banoo Main Teri Dulhann as Sagar Pratap Singh.2008Not Awarded2009Not Awarded2010Deven Bhojani for Baa Bahoo Aur Baby as Gopal "Gattu" Thakkar.2011Not Awarded2012Manish Wadhwa for Chandragupta Maurya as Chanakya.
Jay Soni for Sasural Genda Phool as Ishaan Kashyap
 Ram Kapoor for Bade Acche Lagte Hain as Ram Kapoor
 Mohnish Behl for Kuch Toh Log Kahenge as Dr. Ashutosh
 Narendra Jha for Havan as Hari Om Bappaji2013Mohit Raina for Devon Ke Dev...Mahadev as Shiva.
Sumit Vats for Hitler Didi as Rishi Diwan
Dilip Joshi for Taarak Mehta Ka Ooltah Chashmah as Jethalal Gada
Bhavesh Balchandani for Ek Veer Ki Ardaas...Veera as Ranvijay Singh
Ram Kapoor for Bade Achhe Lagte Hain as Ram Kapoor2014Anil Kapoor for 24 as Jai Singh Rathod.
Mohit Raina for Devon Ke Dev...Mahadev as Shiva
Ram Kapoor for  Bade Achhe Lagte Hain as Ram Kapoor
Gautam Rode for Saraswatichandra as Saraswatichandra
Yash Tonk for Pavitra Bandhan as Girish2015Not Awarded2016Not Awarded2017Not Awarded2018Not Awarded2019Mohit Raina for 21 Sarfarosh - Saragarhi 1897 as Havildar Ishar Singh'''

References

TV awards for lead actor
Indian Telly Awards